Henri-Michel-Antoine Chapu (29 September 1833 – 21 April 1891) was a French sculptor in a modified Neoclassical tradition who was known for his use of allegory in his work.

Life and career
Born in Le Mée-sur-Seine into modest circumstances, Chapu moved to Paris with his family and in 1847 entered the Petit École with the intention of studying drawing and becoming an interior decorator. There his talents began to be recognized and he was admitted to the École des Beaux-Arts in 1849. In 1850 he began working and studying with a well-known sculptor James Pradier. 

Following Pradier's death in 1852 Chapu began studying with another sculptor, Francisque Duret. After coming in second in 1851, he won the Prix de Rome in 1855, then spent five years in Italy.

His statues Mercury of 1861 and Jeanne d'Arc of 1870 (in which she was represented as a peasant girl) were his first big successes, and led to many commissions thereafter. He is also known for his medals, and led the French revival in the medal as an artistic form.

Chapu taught at Paris' Academie Julian. Among his students was American sculptor Cyrus Dallin who studied under him in 1888-1889.

An Officer of the French Legion of Honor, Chapu died in Paris in 1891.

At least four full-scale reproductions of Jeanne d'Arc are on permanent display at universities in Virginia: in McConnell Library at Radford University in Radford, Virginia; beneath the rotunda in Ruffner Hall at Longwood University in Farmville, Virginia; at James Madison University; and at the University of Mary Washington.

Notable works

Monument to Henri Regnault in the courtyard of École des Beaux-Arts (1872)
Tomb of Marie d'Agoult (1877)
Four Seasons on the facade of grande magasin Printemps, Paris (1881–89), for architect Paul Sédille
Monument to Gustave Flaubert (1890), his last major work.

See also
List of works by Henri Chapu

References

Fusco, Peter and H. W. Janson, editors, The Romantics to Rodin, Los Angeles County Museum of Art 1980
Mackay, James, The Dictionary of Sculptors in Bronze, Antique Collectors Club, Woodbridge, Suffolk 1977

External links
 

1833 births
1891 deaths
French medallists
Academic staff of the Académie Julian
Prix de Rome for sculpture
Members of the Académie des beaux-arts
Officiers of the Légion d'honneur
19th-century French sculptors
French male sculptors
19th-century French male artists